Mount Lemmon, with a summit elevation of , is the highest point in the Santa Catalina Mountains. It is located in the Coronado National Forest north of Tucson, Arizona, United States. Mount Lemmon was named for botanist Sara Plummer Lemmon, who trekked to the top of the mountain with her husband and E. O. Stratton, a local rancher, by horse and foot in 1881. Mount Lemmon is also known as Babad Do'ag, or Frog Mountain to the Tohono O'odham.

Geography

Climate
Due to the elevation change from the bottom to the top, the summit of the mountain can be twenty to thirty degrees cooler than the base. It usually sees at least one snow fall during the winter months, making it a cool escape and popular tourist attraction for Tucson inhabitants.

Geology
Mount Lemmon is made up of Bolsa Quartzite, Dripping Spring Quartzite, and a local sandstone and conglomerate. The portions have been intruded by a Diabase Dike of the Apace Group.

Summerhaven

Summerhaven is a small town near the top of the mountain. It is a summer residence for many but there are some year round residents. There are many small cabins most of which were rebuilt after the Aspen Fire of July 2003.

Mount Lemmon Station Observatory

At the peak is the Mount Lemmon Observatory, which was formerly the site of a USAF radar base of the Air Defense Command, and the building that formerly housed a military emergency radar tracking station for landing the Space Shuttle at White Sands Missile Range. Although the United States military had a presence on the mountain for several decades all their facilities have been abandoned and were given to the United States Forest Service. The area and buildings that makes up the Mount Lemmon Station Observatory are leased from the Forest Service by the University of Arizona. The telescopes on the mountain are still used for astronomical research today by organizations such as the Catalina Sky Survey, the Mount Lemmon Sky Center, the University of Arizona Astronomy Camp program, the University of Arizona, and the University of Minnesota. The educational resources at the top of the mountain make it a unique research and teaching destination.

Catalina Highway

The Catalina Highway, also called the Mount Lemmon Highway, as well as the Hitchcock Highway (after Frank Harris Hitchcock), runs up the Santa Catalina Mountains from the east side of Tucson up to Summerhaven, at the top of Mt. Lemmon. The beautiful, curving road is a favorite drive for tourists, for locals escaping summer's heat and cyclists, and has been recently designated as the Sky Island Parkway, part of the US National Scenic Byway system.

2010 saw the inaugural running of the Mount Lemmon Marathon.

Fees and permits 
Catalina Highway charges tolls for parking, camping, and hiking.  However, the tolls are only officially charged for people who are camping.  Tolls for other events, such as hiking, parking, or grilling, are a part of the honor system.  Park rangers will not check for toll payments unless someone is using the park campgrounds.  Anyone wishing to sightsee or travel to Summerhaven are not subjected to paying tolls.

Back side

An unpaved road to the summit on the north side of Mount Lemmon starts in Oracle, which is on Arizona Route 77 north of Tucson. It offers a secondary route to the top. This route is popular with off-road 4x4 drivers and with off-road or dual-purpose motorcyclists.  This road ends at the Catalina Highway near Loma Linda. Before the Catalina Highway was built it was the only route up the mountain.

See also
 List of Ultras of the United States
 Mount Lemmon Observatory
 Mount Lemmon Ski Valley
 Mount Lemmon Survey

References

External links

 
 
 NOAA "Mount Lemmon Forecast".
 

Santa Catalina Mountains
Geography of Tucson, Arizona
Lemmon
Landforms of Pima County, Arizona
Mountains of Pima County, Arizona
North American 2000 m summits